Round Rock is a glacial rock islet of around  in size. In 1914, congressman Thomas L. Reilly requested Round Rock to be connected to Tuxis Island by a breakwater, and extended towards Madison Wharf. It is rarely grouped into the Thimble Islands archipelago. The islet is often represented without a name on maps, and often appears as little more than a small circle, as it is too small to consistently label. Smaller scale maps do, however include the name.

See also
Tuxis Island
Gull Rock, Madison
Madison Reef
Thimble Islands
Outer Lands

References

Coastal islands of Connecticut
Landforms of New Haven County, Connecticut
Madison, Connecticut